Robert Mikhail Moskal (October 24, 1937 – August 7, 2022) was a bishop of the Ukrainian Greek Catholic Church in the United States. He served as the first eparch (bishop) of the Ukrainian Catholic Eparchy of Saint Josaphat in Parma from 1984 to 2009.

Biography
Born in Carnegie, Pennsylvania, Moskal was ordained a priest for the Archeparchy of Philadelphia on March 25, 1963, by Archbishop Ambrozij Andrew Senyshyn, O.S.B.M. Pope John Paul II named Moskal as the Titular Bishop of Agathopolis and Auxiliary Bishop of Philadelphia on August 3, 1981. He was ordained a bishop by Archbishop Stephen Sulyk on October 13, 1981. The principal co-consecrators were eparchs Basil Losten of Stamford and Innocent Lotocky, O.S.B.M. of Chicago. Moskal was named the first eparch of Parma on December 5, 1983. He served the eparchy until his resignation was accepted by Pope Benedict XVI on July 29, 2009.

He died on August 7, 2022, at the age of 84.

See also
 

 Catholic Church hierarchy
 Catholic Church in the United States
 Historical list of the Catholic bishops of the United States
 List of Catholic bishops of the United States
 Lists of patriarchs, archbishops, and bishops

References

External links
Ukrainian Catholic Eparchy of Parma Official Site

Episcopal succession

1937 births
2022 deaths
People from Carnegie, Pennsylvania
Bishops of the Ukrainian Greek Catholic Church
American people of Ukrainian descent
American Eastern Catholic bishops
21st-century Eastern Catholic bishops
21st-century American clergy